This is a list of  Malawian journalists, those born in Malawi and who have established citizenship or residency.

B
Mabvuto Banda
Violet Banda
David Blair (journalist)

C
Chikoko, Rex

G
Gregory Gondwe

K
Onesimo Makani Kabweza

M
Emily Mkamanga

Agnes Mizere

T
Raphael Tenthani

See also

 List of Malawians

 Outline of Malawi

Malawi
Journalist